Marcial Manrique Hernandez (born 20 April 1974) is a Dutch former army officer and former politician.

He became a member of the House of Representatives for the Party for Freedom (PVV) on 17 June 2010. As an MP, he focused on matters of the Dutch defense.

Hernandez announced on 3 July 2012, in the wake of a press conference by Geert Wilders, that he had just left the PVV due to internal struggles. He did so together with fellow MP Wim Kortenoeven. They formed the Kortenoeven/Hernandez Group, that was in Parliament until 19 September 2012 (after the general elections, in which they didn't take part).

References
  Parlement.com biography

1974 births
Living people
Independent politicians in the Netherlands
Members of the House of Representatives (Netherlands)
Party for Freedom politicians
People from Kampen, Overijssel
People from Zaanstad
Royal Netherlands Army officers
21st-century Dutch politicians